Michael J. Freedman is an American computer scientist who is the Robert E. Kahn Professor of Computer Science at Princeton University, where he works on distributed systems, networking, and security.  He is also the cofounder of database company Timescale.

Education and career
Freedman graduated from Wyoming Valley West High School in Pennsylvania in 1997. In 2001 and 2002, he earned an S.B. and a M.Eng., respectively, at the Massachusetts Institute of Technology. In 2005 and 2007, he earned an M.S. and a Ph.D., respectively, from the Courant Institute of Mathematical Sciences at New York University, and spent 2005–2007 at Stanford University. Freedman completed his doctoral studies under David Mazières, who Freedman worked with to release the Coral Content Distribution Network in 2004. In 2007, he was appointed a professor at Princeton University.

With David Mazières, Freedman designed and operated the Coral Content Distribution Network, a peer-to-peer content distribution network that was initially released in 2004 and operated until 2015. In March 2006, Freedman co-founded Illuminics Systems, an information technology company working in the area of IP geolocation and intelligence, with Martin Casado. The company was acquired by Quova in November 2006.

Freedman's research interests include distributed systems, networking, and security. In addition to his work with the Coral Content Distribution Network, he has designed systems such as TimescaleDB and JetStream.

Recognition
In 2011, Freedman received the Presidential Early Career Award for Scientists and Engineers for his work in designing, building, and prototyping a "modern, highly scalable, replicated storage cloud system" in addition to efforts to increase student diversity at Princeton University. His research involving the design and deployment of geo-distributed systems earned him the Grace Murray Hopper Award in 2018. He was elected as an ACM Fellow in 2019 "for contributions to robust distributed systems for the modern cloud", and was awarded the SIGOPS Mark Weiser Award by the organization in 2021.

Selected publications

References

External links
 Michael J. Freedman on the Princeton University website
 

Living people
American computer scientists
American engineers
New York University alumni
MIT School of Engineering alumni
Princeton University faculty
21st-century American engineers
Grace Murray Hopper Award laureates
Fellows of the Association for Computing Machinery
Year of birth missing (living people)
Recipients of the Presidential Early Career Award for Scientists and Engineers